Protein SOGA1 also known as SOGA family member 1 or suppressor of glucose, autophagy-associated protein 1 (SOGA1) is a protein that in humans is encoded by the SOGA1 gene.

References

Further reading